Svyatoslav Igorevich Georgiyevsky (born 26 August 1995) is a Russian professional football player. He plays for FC Zorkiy Krasnogorsk.

Club career
He made his professional debut on 24 September 2014 for PFC CSKA Moscow in a Russian Cup game against FC Khimik Dzerzhinsk.

He made his debut for the main squad of FC Kuban Krasnodar on 23 September 2015 in a Russian Cup game against FC Shinnik Yaroslavl.

He made his Russian Football Premier League debut on 7 November 2015 for FC Kuban Krasnodar in a game against FC Dynamo Moscow.

References

External links
 

1995 births
Footballers from Moscow
Living people
Russian footballers
Association football midfielders
PFC CSKA Moscow players
FC Kuban Krasnodar players
Russian Premier League players
FC Anzhi Makhachkala players
PFC Krylia Sovetov Samara players
FC Ararat Moscow players
FC Khimki players
FC SKA-Khabarovsk players